Shangqiu, alternately romanized as Shangkiu, is a city in eastern Henan province, Central China. It borders Kaifeng to the northwest, Zhoukou to the southwest, and the provinces of Shandong and Anhui to the northeast and southeast respectively. Its population was 7,816,831 inhabitants as of the 2020 Chinese census whom 2,831,814 lived in the built-up (or metro) area made up of two urban districts (Liangyuan and Suiyang) and Yucheng county now being conurbated. 

Shangqiu and surrounding area was an important base for the Shang dynasty (c. 1600 – c. 1046 BC), and the city itself was established more than three millennia ago. Shangqiu has grown significantly in recent years. It is located at an important location at the junction of several major railways, making it a major regional transportation hub.

History

The history of Shangqiu ("Hills of Shang") is closely related to the very beginning of Chinese history. The tradition dates back to the Three August Ones and Five Emperors periods (c. 25th century BC), when the legendary Emperors Shennong, Zhuanxu and Ku were said to be living in the present Shangqiu area. The son of Emperor Ku, Qi, who helped  Yu the Great to control floods, was enfeoffed the area of Shang, who also became the ancestor of the ancient Shang. Shangqiu was also reportedly one of the capitals defended by the Xia emperor Xiang, troubled by rebellions in his reign. The thirteenth generation grandson of Qi, Tang overthrew the ruling Xia dynasty and founded the Shang dynasty, with its first capital at Nanbo (currently south of Shangqiu). Around the 11th century BC, the Shang dynasty was replaced by the Zhou dynasty. The royal descendants of the Shang dynasty were enfeoffed the area of Shangqiu, which later became the state of Song. 

The Song capital, known as Suiyang, was located at present-day Nanguan (南关) in the south of Shangqiu's urban area. The Song was a major power during the Spring and Autumn era, but declined during the Warring States era and eventually fell to the Qi and Wei in 286 BC. In the Han dynasty, Suiyang served as the capital of the Liang Kingdom. King Xiao of Liang (r. 169 BC – 144 BC) stayed loyal to the Emperor Jing of Han in the Rebellion of the Seven States, during which a failed siege of Suiyang caused the collapse of the main rebel army. The king was also a famous patron of arts and literature who hosted some of the best known Han poets, such as Zhuang Ji and Sima Xiangru, in the Liang capital. 

From the Cao Wei dynasty to the early Sui dynasty, Suiyang was the seat of Liang Commandery (梁郡). It became the seat of Song Prefecture (Songzhou) in 596 AD. During the An Lushan rebellion in the Tang dynasty, a ten-month-long siege of Suiyang in 757 turned the tide of the war to the Tang's favor.

Before he ascended to the imperial throne as the Emperor Taizu of Song, Zhao Kuangyin was the jiedushi (military governor) of Guidejun (歸德軍), a region centered in Songzhou. Thus, he chose "Song" as the name of the new dynasty he founded in 960. The city was the southern capital of the Northern Song dynasty under the name Nanjing. Shangqiu was the first in a series of temporary capitals that the Song Dynasty government moved to during their retreat from the north, when most of northern China had been conquered by the Jurchens in the Jin–Song wars. The Song court had retreated south to the city from their original capital in Kaifeng, after it was captured by the Jurchens in the Jingkang Incident of 1127. The court moved to Shangqiu because of its historical importance to Emperor Taizu. The symbolism of the city was meant to secure the political legitimacy of the new Emperor Gaozong, who was crowned emperor of China in Shangqiu on June 12, 1127. The capital was again moved in 1128 to Yangzhou, and finally to Hangzhou in 1129. In the Yuan, Ming and Qing dynasties, Shangqiu was governed as Guide Prefecture (歸德府). The current name appeared in 1545, when a new Shangqiu County was created to administer the city and its surrounding areas.

Under the Republic, Shangqiu was considered a key city in eastern Henan owing to its position along the Lunghai Railway between the port of Haizhou on the East China Sea and Lanzhou in central China. It changed hands frequently during the fighting among the Chinese warlords  in 1927. Following the Manchurian Incident, Gui'de (Kwei-teh) Airbase was established, and became an auxiliary/forward airbase of the Nationalist Air Force of China during the War of Resistance-World War II (1937-1945), and supported aerial-attack missions against Imperial Japanese positions in the northern-front of the war; the 4th Fighter-Attack Group of the Chinese Air Force flew from Gui'de Airbase in March–April 1938 in support of Chinese ground forces at the Battle of Taierzhuang. Gui'de Airbase is now known as Shangqiu Airport.

Geography and climate

Shangqiu is the easternmost prefecture of Henan province. Its administrative area ranges in longitude from 114 °49′ E to 116° 39′ E and in latitude from 33° 43′ N to 34° 52′ N, covering .

Shangqiu has a monsoon-influenced humid subtropical climate (Köppen Cwa), with four distinct seasons. Winters are cool and mostly dry while summers are hot and humid; spring is warm and sees some, but not much rainfall, while autumn weather is crisp and drier. Close to two-thirds of the annual precipitation occurs from June to September. The average temperature is below 10 °C for winter, 22 °C for summer, and between 10-22 °C for spring and autumn. Shangqiu City has a long winter, followed by summer, and a significantly shorter spring and autumn.

The average annual precipitation in the urban area of Shangqiu City has been 711.9 mm, and the corresponding total precipitation is 59.13 million cubic meters. The average annual runoff depth is 76.8 mm and the total runoff is 6.405 million cubic meters.

Government
The government of Shangqiu is responsible for the making and implementing of local policies. Since agriculture is still a major part of the economy of Shangqiu, many of the work is related to farmers and the development of the rural area. It is also observed that the government is exerting more and more efforts to attract foreign investment to spur local development.
The current mayor is Tao Minglun.

Demographics
According to the 2010 Census, Shangqiu has a population of 7,362,472. That is 390,528 inhabitants less than in 2000 (the population shrank 5.04% in ten years).

Administration
The prefecture-level city of Shangqiu administers 2 districts, 1 county-level city and 6 counties. The information here presented uses the metric system and data from 2010 National Population Census.

Religion
Shangqiu is traditionally a centre of the indigenous Chinese religious cult of Huoshen (火神 "Fire God"). An ancient small Temple of the Fire God has been expanded throughout the 2010s to become possibly the biggest temple complex dedicated to the god in China. Moreover, Shangqiu traditionally hosted the headquarters of Liguaism (Li Symbol transmission), the most important denomination of Baguadao.

Economy

Agriculture
Situated on the North China Plain, Shangqiu is part of a traditionally agricultural region. The fertile soil and convenient irrigation facilities greatly help the production of crops and other plants. As of 2005, there are about 719,864 hectare planted. The most important agricultural products are wheat, maize, cotton, sesame, vegetables, fruit, tobacco, and livestock. In 2002, it produced about 4.5 million tons of crops, 200 thousand tons of cotton, 1.1 million tons of fruits, and 550 thousand tons of livestock.

Industry
Compared with the agriculture, the industry of Shangqiu is  relatively less developed. However, since the 1990s, it has experienced rapid growth. The food producing and packing company, Kedi group, has already been the number one exporter of frozen vegetables in the country. The large reserves of coal in Shangqiu (the Yongcheng-Xiayi coal mine is estimated to have a total reserves of 10 billion tons) also boosts up the energy industry, such as electricity generation and aluminium electrolysis.

Transportation
Since the completion of east-west running Longhai railway in 1916, Shangqiu has been a local transportation center. This standing is greatly enhanced following the construction of the Beijing-Kowloon (Hong Kong) railway in 1996, which crosses with Longhai railway at Shangqiu. Nowadays, Longhai railway has become the Chinese segment of the larger "European-Asia continental landbridge," which runs from the sea port city Lianyungang to Rotterdam, the Netherlands. Shangqiu thus obtains the name of the city of the "golden cross." On the other hand, the road transport is also convenient and getting even better. The east-west direction Lianyungang-Khorghas (Xinjiang) national route 310 and north-south Beijing-Zhuhai national routh 105 also cross at Shangqiu. Highway traffic is fast-developing too. The Shangqiu-Kaifeng 
segment of the Lianyungang-Khorghas highway is already in use. Future planning for highway construction is also underway.

Shangqiu–Hangzhou high-speed railway began operation in June 2020.

Education
The education sector of Shangqiu is mainly professional training oriented, with an 
increasing number of such colleges coming into sight ever since the 1990s.

Colleges and universities
Shangqiu University
Shangqiu Normal University 
Shangqiu Institute of Technology 
Shangqiu Professional Training College
Shangqiu Medical College

Society and culture

Lying in the heart of the North China Plain, Shangqiu benefits from a deep cultural tradition. The first star observatory in China, Ebo Tai, was established in Shangqiu. Yingtian Shuyuan, one of the largest four official education agencies in north Song Dynasty, is located in the Suiyang district of Shangqiu. The Suiyang old city, which was built in 1511 during the Ming Dynasty, is one of the best preserved traditional cities in China, and was enlisted as one of the famous historical cities in China by the central government in 1986. The rich culture also raised many famous cultural figures. Cangjie, the legendary inventor of Chinese characters, was living in Shangqiu in the far-ancient periods. Zhuangzi, the great ancient philosopher of China, was born here around the 4th century BC. Another great philosopher, Mozi, living in the same period as Zhuangzi, was also a Shangqiu native.

Tourist attractions
 The ancient city of Suiyang
 Temple of Hua Mulan
 Former residence of Zhuangzi
 Ebo Tai, the first star observatory of China
 Mangdang Mountain tourism site
 Shangqiu Ancient Culture Tourist Area
 Huaihai Battle Chenguanzhuang Memorial Hall Scenic Spot
 Beihu Scenic Area, Sui County
 Cangjie Tomb
 Sui Emperor's Mausoleum
 Zhuangzi Cultural Tourism Scenic Area

Famous people of Shangqiu
 Cangjie
 Zhuangzi
 Mozi
 Hua Mulan
 Jiang Yan
 Hou Fangyu
 Xiaolan Huangpu
 Xu Zhiyong
 Shang Tang
 Wang Junguang
 Dai De (戴德)
 Dai Sheng (戴圣)

Miscellaneous
Shangqiu is also a Roman Catholic diocese.
The village contains a temple dedicated to Mulan, and many nearby businesses use her name as a local trademark.
According to the history, the ancestral ancestor of the merchants (xiè) was able to control the water, seal the business, and then migrate. Later generations said that the ruins of the merchants had lived in the "Shangqiu".

References

External links
Government website of Shangqiu

 
Cities in Henan
Metropolitan areas of China
Populated places established in the 10th century
Prefecture-level divisions of Henan